Thomas Chad Beasley (born November 13, 1978) is a former American football offensive tackle in the National Football League for the Cleveland Browns. He played college football at Virginia Tech and was drafted in the seventh round of the 2002 NFL Draft by the Minnesota Vikings. His father Tom Beasley also played for Virginia Tech and in the NFL (for the Pittsburgh Steelers).

References

1978 births
Living people
People from Upper St. Clair Township, Allegheny County, Pennsylvania
American football offensive tackles
Cleveland Browns players
Virginia Tech Hokies football players
Players of American football from Pennsylvania